Jean-Louis Raduit de Souches (16 August 1608 to 12 August 1682), also known as Ludwig de Souches, was a French-born professional soldier who spent a number of years in the Swedish Army before switching to Imperial service in 1642. Although he was a capable officer who reached the rank of Field Marshal, his career was marred by a tendency to quarrel with his colleagues and superiors.

Born into a family of minor French Protestant nobility, de Souches went into exile after the Siege of La Rochelle in 1629. He served in the Swedish army when it entered the Thirty Years' War against Emperor Ferdinand III and by 1642 was colonel of an infantry regiment. However, he fell out with his superior officer and switched sides, joining the Imperial army.

He established his reputation in the defence of Brno against the Swedes in 1645 and was promoted Field Marshal in 1664. When Emperor Leopold joined the Franco-Dutch War in 1673, de Souches was appointed commander of Imperial forces in the Low Countries but had a poor relationship with his Dutch and Spanish allies and was removed in December 1674. 

This was the end of his military career; he retired to his estates in at Jevišovice in Moravia, where he died on 12 August 1682 and was buried in the Church of St. James (Brno).

Personal details
Jean-Louis Raduit de Souches was born on 16 August 1608, son of Jean Ratuit, Sieur de Barres (died 1614), and his wife Marguerite de Bourdigalea (died after 1636). Both parents were members of the Huguenot nobility, originally from Aunis, who owned property in the Protestant stronghold of La Rochelle. His elder brother was killed serving with the French army in 1636, while he also had a sister, Marguerite (died 1654). 

His first wife Anna Elisabeth de Hoffkirchen died in 1663; they had two sons, Jean Louis (died 1717) and Charles Louis (1645–1691), who both served in the Imperial Army, and two daughters, Anna Dorotha (1652–1724) and Eleonora. Anna Salome Aspermont-Reckheim (1648–1729) became his second wife in 1677; they had no surviving children.

Career

Thirty Years War
Souches began his military career during the siege of La Rochelle, part of the 1627 to 1629 Huguenot rebellions against Louis XIII of France. When the town surrendered in October 1628, he went into exile in Protestant Sweden, where he joined the army led by Gustavus Adolphus which entered the Thirty Years War in 1630. By 1636, he was captain in an infantry regiment which unsuccessfully defended Stargard against an Imperial force; he narrowly escaped court martial after accusing his commanding officer of negligence. This was symptomatic of a quarrelsome tendency which followed him throughout his career. 

In May 1636, France formally entered the Thirty Years War in alliance with Sweden; the rapid expansion of the French army created vacancies for experienced officers and de Souches used the opportunity to return home. He was unable to obtain a satisfactory position and returned to Sweden in August 1639, where he was promoted colonel of a regiment in the force that invaded Bohemia in early 1640. However, he later fell out with his superior officer whom he challenged to a duel in violation of military regulations; he resigned from the Swedish army in early 1642 and a few months later was appointed colonel in the Imperial army.       

Over the next two years, de Souches took part in the 1643 invasion of Pomerania and an attack on the Swedish-held city of Olomouc in Moravia. Although both actions were unsuccessful, he impressed his superiors sufficiently to be given command of defending Brno in May 1645 against a force led by Lennart Torstensson; after a siege described as "one of the epic stands of the Imperial army", the Swedes retreated in August having lost 8,000 men. This contributed to the failure of Torstensson's attempt to attack Vienna and helped speed up peace negotiations at Westphalia. Until the end of the war, de Souches contributed to regaining Swedish-occupied cities in the Erblande like the capture of Jihlava in 1647.  

De Souches was rewarded with promotion to the rank of general and granted lands outside Brno; when the war finally ended in 1648, he was placed in charge of supervising the withdrawal of Swedish troops from Moravia and made Governor of Špilberk Castle. In 1649, he was elevated to the Moravian nobility on condition he converted to Catholicism within the next three years.

Later career
In 1654, Sweden attacked the Polish–Lithuanian Commonwealth, initiating the Second Northern War. When the fighting expanded to include Brandenburg-Prussia in 1657, Austria joined the anti-Swedish coalition. With de Souches in charge of the infantry, an army under Melchior von Hatzfeldt was sent to support Poland and helped recapture Kraków in August 1657. De Souches later commanded the Austrian contingent at the Siege of Toruń, whose Swedish garrison surrendered in December 1658. In 1659, he was given command of an army of 13,000 which invaded Swedish Pomerania and besieged Stettin; before the town fell, the Treaty of Oliva ended the war in May 1660, while de Souches quarrelled with his colleague Raimondo Montecuccoli and was ordered home to Moravia. 

The 1663 to 1664 Austro-Turkish War began when Ottoman forces invaded Hungary and over-ran large parts of eastern and southern Moravia. Having successfully defended Brno and Olomouc, de Souches was promoted Field Marshall in May 1664 and given command of one of three separate forces operating in Hungary, with the other two led by Montecuccoli and Miklós Zrínyi. Although he won a minor victory at Levice in July 1664, while Montecuccoli stopped the main Ottoman advance at Saint Gotthard in August, Leopold was concerned by the expansionist policies of Louis XIV of France and agreed the Peace of Vasvár a few days later.

          

In October 1664, de Souches was appointed Governor of Komárom, an important town on the modern Slovakian/Hungarian border, and spent the next few years supervising the construction of new fortifications there, as well as other towns in the region. He also became a member of the Hofkriegsrat, or Imperial War Council, although his duties were largely nominal. When Austria entered the Franco-Dutch War in 1673 as an ally of the Dutch Republic and Spain, he was appointed commander of Imperial troops in the Low Countries and took part in the Battle of Seneffe in August 1674. The Imperial troops suffered minimal casualties in what was the bloodiest battle of the war and his Allies subsequently claimed de Souches had ignored requests for support. One suggestion is he did so under instructions from Emperor Leopold, who wanted to conserve resources for the Rhineland campaign, which he viewed as having far greater strategic significance.

Shortly thereafter, the Allies attacked the town of Oudenarde; siege operations commenced on 16 September, and the French began marching to its relief three days later. The Dutch and Spanish redoubled efforts to breach the walls before their arrival, but without advising his colleagues, de Souches withdrew the Imperial artillery to Ghent. Since his troops would not fight without their guns, and the Dutch and Spanish could not face the French on their own, the Allies were forced to abandon the siege. After strong protests from the Dutch States General, supported by some of his Austrian colleagues, de Souches was relieved of his command. In December 1674, Emperor Leopold set up an enquiry into his conduct, which resulted in de Souches being dismissed from his remaining military positions. He retired to his estates at Jevišovice in Moravia, where he died on 12 August 1682 and was buried in the Church of St. James (Brno).

References

Sources
 
 
 
 
 
 

1608 births
1682 deaths
People from La Rochelle
Military personnel of the Thirty Years' War
People of the Austro-Turkish War (1663–64)
Military personnel of the Franco-Dutch War
Field marshals of the Holy Roman Empire